WSVM (1490 AM, 96.5 FM) is a radio station broadcasting an adult hits format, Licensed to Valdese, North Carolina, United States, it serves Burke, Caldwell, Lincoln, Catawba, Alexander, Cleveland and Gaston counties. The station is owned by Main Street Broadcasting, Inc.

History
WSVM signed on October 6, 1961.

The station's call letters are said to stand for "We Serve Valdese Merchants". Another popular belief is the letters mean "We Serve Valdese, Morganton" and since its arrival on the FM dial, it means "We Serve a Variety of Music".

During most of the first decade of the 21st century, WSVM aired the Timeless format, and was owned by Burke County Broadcasting, principals being 
Robert R. Hilker, William R. Rollins & various Valdese merchants.  Both Hilker & Rollins were both past President of the North Carolina Association of Broadcasting and in the North Carolina Broadcasting Hall of Fame!  WSVM was part of Suburban Radio Group, owned by Hilker & Rollins. Charlie Hicks worked at the station from 1969 to 1970 before taking the helm at another Suburban Radio Group affiliate.

Later on, the station was sold to GHB Broadcasting Company.

In August 2008, GHB Broadcasting sold WSVM to Radio Emmanuel, and the format was to be changed to Christian music, with most of the programming in Spanish. This did not happen.

In later years, local programming on WSVM included Clegg and Company, hosted by Jerry Clegg, and The Trading Post.

WSVM ceased operations May 31, 2010 for the "immediate future." The last song was "May the Good Lord Bless and Keep You" by Jim Reeves.

The station came back on the air September 1, 2010 by Bannon Broadcasting Company of Hudson operates and manages the day-to-day operation.  Jim Bannon operated WSVM with classic hits of the decades of the 1960s, 1970s and 1980s (rock oldies), plus high school sports.  WSVM calls itself V-radio for Valdese. The station is automated except for the "Breakfast Club" morning show. and a few other local programs.

After Bannon Broadcasting Company decided to allow its lease on WSVM to expire on January 2, 2012, GHB of Waxhaw reached a deal to sell the station to the town of Valdese, which planned to use the property for an expansion of a neighboring cemetery. Bert Lindsay bought the WSVM broadcast license from GHB and began running the station prior to the sale's becoming finalized on September 27, 2012 at a purchase price of $12,000. He continued the station's format, including The Trading Post from 10 to 11 six mornings a week, as well as Draughn High School sports; East Burke High School sports will be added. Also being considered are beach music and doo-wop programs, and the return of the Beatles Brunch.

Main Street Broadcasting
The town of Valdese sold the WSVM broadcast equipment to Main Street Broadcasting and is no longer affiliated with the station. The Praley street studios have been listed as "residential" since Main Street Broadcasting bought the station.

WSVM operated from a satellite studio in Baton, NC while construction on the new studio building at 225 west main street Valdese was being completed.

Bert Lindsay sold WSVM to Mainstreet Broadcasting effective October 20, 2016 for $9,000.
Vance Patterson and Eddie Jolly's company Main Street Broadcasting bought the station equipment from the Town of Valdese and vacated the Praley Street location. WSVM received authorization from the FCC to operate a translator for the Valdese area at 96.5 FM and has been broadcasting since February 3, 2017.

In September 2018,  WSVM moved into their new modern 21st Century studios designed by broadcast engineer Michael Griffin and located at 225 Main Street, Valdese, NC. WSVM began broadcasting live shows from the new studios. Live and Local from Main Street Valdese. The station started getting nationwide attention after a video by Tony Lee Glenn showcases Vice President Eddie Jolly and the station on YouTube.
Wsvm won "Business of the year 2022" in November of 2022.

References

External links

WSVM on Facebook

SVM
Radio stations established in 1961